Nannastacus is a genus of crustaceans in the order Cumacea.  It contains the following species:

Nannastacus agnatus Calman, 1911
Nannastacus angulifera Lomakina, 1967
Nannastacus asper Hale, 1945
Nannastacus brevicaudatus Calman, 1905
Nannastacus erinaceus Zimmer, 1913
Nannastacus euxinicus Bacescu, 1951
Nannastacus gamoi Bacescu, 1992
Nannastacus georgi Stebbing, 1900
Nannastacus gibbosus Calman, 1911
Nannastacus goniatus Gamo, 1962
Nannastacus gurneyi
Nannastacus inconstans Hale, 1945
Nannastacus inflatus Hale, 1945
Nannastacus johnstoni Hale, 1945
Nannastacus lima (Hale, 1936)
Nannastacus longirostris G. O. Sars, 1879
Nannastacus minor Calman, 1911
Nannastacus muelleri Petrescu, 1997
Nannastacus mystacinus Zimmer, 1921
Nannastacus nyctagineus Gamo, 1962
Nannastacus occidentalis Bacescu & Muradian, 1975
Nannastacus ossiani Stebbing, 1900
Nannastacus pardus Calman, 1905
Nannastacus parvulus Bacescu & Muradian, 1975
Nannastacus pectinatus Gamo, 1962
Nannastacus pruinosus Gamo, 1962
Nannastacus reptans Calman, 1911
Nannastacus sauteri Zimmer, 1921
Nannastacus spinosus (Paulson, 1875)
Nannastacus spinulosus Gamo, 1962
Nannastacus stebbingi Calman, 1904
Nannastacus subinflatus Hale, 1945
Nannastacus suhmi Sars, 1886
Nannastacus tardus Calman, 1911
Nannastacus turcicus Bacescu, 1982
Nannastacus umbellulifer Gamo, 1963
Nannastacus unguiculatus (Bate, 1859)
Nannastacus wisseni Petrescu, 1997
Nannastacus zimmeri Calman, 1911

References

External links

Cumacea